Gabriel Sapolsky (born September 26, 1972) is an American professional wrestling promoter, creative writer, and booker who currently works for WWE. Sapolsky has also held various creative and marketing positions in the professional wrestling industry, notably as Paul Heyman's personal assistant with Extreme Championship Wrestling, the co-founder and head of talent relations (booker) at Ring of Honor, the vice-president of Dragon Gate USA, vice-president of talent relations, creative and marketing of the World Wrestling Network (WWN) and creative writer (booker) and founder of EVOLVE. Sapolsky also worked in a booking capacity for various other promotions including Full Impact Pro and Style Battle, as well as for special events like the WWN Supershow and the Jeff Peterson Memorial Cup.

Early life
Sapolsky attended Runkle Elementary School, and later Brookline High School, graduating in 1990. He received his B.A. in Communications from Temple University and graduated in 1994.

Professional wrestling career
Sapolsky began his career with Extreme Championship Wrestling (ECW) writing a company newsletter, known as The ECW Action Wire, in September 1993. Sapolsky was hired full-time shortly after graduating from Temple University, about the same time that ECW opened its first office in Philadelphia. Sapolsky became a protege of Paul Heyman and handled many different responsibilities, including marketing, promoting and public relations throughout his tenure with the company. Sapolsky also worked the "fan cam" and filmed most ECW events on a camcorder at ringside. The ECW Action Wire morphed into the Official ECW Program, which was sold at live events. Sapolsky wrote, edited and published it. He became an official RF Video employee in 2001, shortly after ECW closed.

Sapolsky took over editing and writing the RF Video Mail Order Catalog and website after ECW. In 2002, Sapolsky co-founded Ring of Honor (ROH) with RF Video owner Rob Feinstein and employee Doug Gentry. Sapolsky was named the booker of the promotion. Sapolsky developed the unique booking style of ROH, which included The Code Of Honor. As the booker of ROH, Sapolsky won Wrestling Observer Newsletters Best Booker award four years in a row from 2004 to 2007. Sapolsky was also the booker for Full Impact Pro (FIP), an independent promotion in Florida that used to be the sister promotion of ROH. Sapolsky used aliases Jimmy Bower and Matt Pike when he filled in on commentary. On October 26, 2008, ROH made an announcement stating that Gabe Sapolsky was no longer working there. After Sapolsky's departure, he also ceased his roles with FIP.

On April 14, 2009, Sapolsky announced the launch of Dragon Gate USA (DGUSA) with himself serving as its vice-president. The promotion's first show, Open the Historic Gate was held July 25, 2009 at The Arena in Philadelphia, Pennsylvania. It was voted in 2009 by the Wrestling Observer Newsletter as the Show of the Year. DGUSA was the American branch of Japan's popular Dragon Gate promotion and as per this connection, it featured the top stars of Japan, and various independent wrestlers in the United States. In early 2010, Sapolsky co-founded EVOLVE along with WWN COO, Sal Hamaoui. EVOLVE began as a means of featuring American based wrestlers while DGUSA focused on Japanese wrestlers. DGUSA held its last event in 2014 and is currently dormant.

Following the dormancy of DGUSA, in August 2014, EVOLVE was relaunched. EVOLVE and DGUSA both became subsidiaries under the parent company World Wrestling Network (WWN). In 2011, WWN launched its live iPPV streaming service, www.WWNLive.com, where Sapolsky helped market and produce the infrastructure in order to start up WWNLive.com. Sapolsky was instrumental in putting together the first WrestleCon in 2013, which featured multiple wrestling shows and a convention. Sapolsky and WWN would split from WrestleCon and start The WWN Live Experience, which featured multiple shows during Wrestlemania week from 2014–2019. Sapolsky was also part of bringing WWN on a two week tour of China in 2014. This was the first time an American independent pro wrestling company toured China. The first WWN Supershow in the United States also took place in 2014. The idea behind the WWN Supershow is to combine title matches and talent from all WWN brands, as well as special guest attractions to the affiliated promotions. WWN signed a deal to provide content to FloSports and help launch the FloSlam.TV channel in November, 2016. The deal was focused on EVOLVE, but featured more brands under the WWN umbrella. The FloSports deal allowed Sapolsky to co-found Style Battle, a promotion based on tournaments on every event. Sapolsky also returned as head booker of FIP. However, FloSlam filed a lawsuit against WWN on September 15, 2017, ending the relationship.

Sapolsky then began to broker a relationship between World Wrestling Entertainment and EVOLVE. He worked closely with "Triple H" Paul Levesque. Eventually, the deal would see WWE send contracted talent to work on EVOLVE events. Several EVOLVE talents were also signed by WWE. The relationship saw EVOLVE present the only live independent wrestling special ever on The WWE Network on July 13th, 2019. Sapolsky began working as a creative consultant with WWE in January of 2016. He became part of Triple H's team in NXT. Sapolsky worked on the NXT TV shows, NXT Takeover, talent scouting and talent development. Although Sapolsky had been working for NXT for one year, it became public on January 10, 2018, Sapolsky signed a contract with WWE as a consultant. 

EVOLVE shut down shortly after the pandemic started in 2020 and WWE purchased all the company's assets. On January 6, 2022, Sapolsky was released by WWE when WWE released several members of Levesque's team. On September 23, it was reported that Sapolsky had re-signed with WWE and joined their creative team.

Other media

Sapolsky has been featured in numerous interviews, podcasts and video features.

Sapolsky has been featured on the WWE DVD and network releases of My Name Is Paul Heyman and Journey to Summerslam: The Destruction of The Shield, featuring former mentor Heyman, and former DGUSA and ROH talent in Dean Ambrose and Seth Rollins.

Mick Foley mentioned Sapolsky in his book, Foley Is Good, a #1 New York Times best seller. Former ROH World Champion, Daniel Bryan, prominently mentioned Sapolsky in his book Yes: My Improbable Journey to the Main Event of WrestleMania. In the book, Bryan writes: "It was the first time anybody had chosen me to be "the Man" – the only time, really- and I can't thank Gabe, ROH, and the ROH fans enough for giving me the opportunity to be the guy to carry the promotion." Sapolsky has also been mentioned in many other books by pro wrestlers.

Vice TV did a documentary on Sapolsky. The show was called The Wrestlers – Best New Talent In America.

 Awards and accomplishments Wrestling Observer Newsletter awards'
Best Booker (2004–2007)

References

External links

1972 births
Living people
American color commentators
American television writers
Brookline High School alumni
American male television writers
People from Brookline, Massachusetts
Professional wrestling announcers
Professional wrestling promoters
Professional wrestling writers
Temple University alumni
Writers from Boston